Stereocaulon paschale is a species of lichen belonging to the family Stereocaulaceae.

It has a cosmopolitan distribution.

In Iceland, it has the conservation status of a vulnerable species (VU).

Ecology
Stereocaulon paschale is host to some lichenicolous fungi which infect various parts of the thallus. Most of these fungi have a Holarctic distribution. These fungi include:

 Arthonia stereocaulina, Infects the phyllocladia but rarely causes disease.
 Catillaria stereocaulorum, Mainly infects the phyllocladia, which can become swollen and dark. It is common in the Arctic.
 Cercidospora stereocaulorum, Infects phyllocladia and sometimes on stems, cephalodia and apothecia.
 Endococcus nanellus, Infects phyllocladia and sometimes on stems, cephalodia and apothecia. Often found in discolored apothecia but does probably not cause the discoloration.
 Lasiosphaeriopsis stereocaulicola, Usually found at the stem base which can turn brown but no other symptoms are known.
 Lichenopeltella stereocaulorum, Most often found on stems. This species was only discovered in 2010.
 Opegrapha stereocaulicola, Infects stems which may become darker.
 Phaeosporobolus alpinus, Commensal. Most commonly found on species of Pertusaria or Ochrolechia.
 Polycoccum trypethelioides, Produces galls on stem which change colour with time turning cinnamon colour or brown.

References

Stereocaulaceae
Lichen species
Taxa named by Carl Linnaeus
Lichens described in 1753
Cosmopolitan species